The  is a dual-voltage electric multiple unit (EMU) train type operated by West Japan Railway Company (JR-West) on limited express services in Japan.

Variants

681-0 series
Four six-car sets (T01–T03, T06) and five three-car sets (T11–T13, T15, T17) are used on Thunderbird services. These trains feature "Thunderbird" branding. Also four six-car sets (W01–W04) and four three-car sets (W11–W14) were used on Hakutaka services. These trains featured "White Wing" logos.

From February 2015, Hakutaka W sets began being repainted into the same livery as 683 series trainsets used on Shirasagi services, with thin blue and orange lines below the window band.

681-1000 series
The pre-series six-car set (T18) and one three-car set (T07) are used on Thunderbird services.

681-2000 series
Two six-car sets (N01–N02) and two three-car sets (N11–N12) were formerly used on Hokuetsu Express Hakutaka services. These trains featured "Snow Rabbit Express" logos.

Interior

Refurbishment
All of the 681 series trainsets used on Thunderbird limited express services underwent a programme of refurbishment from autumn 2015 until the end of fiscal 2018.

References

Further reading
 
 

Electric multiple units of Japan
West Japan Railway Company
Train-related introductions in 1992
Hitachi multiple units
Niigata Transys rolling stock
20 kV AC multiple units
Kinki Sharyo multiple units
Kawasaki multiple units
1500 V DC multiple units of Japan